The Columbus-West Point, MS Combined Statistical Area was formerly defined as consisting of Clay and Lowndes counties in northeastern Mississippi, which were separately treated as the  West Point Micropolitan Statistical Area and Columbus Micropolitan Statistical Area, respectively. As of the 2000 census, the CSA had a population of 83,565. A July 1, 2009 estimate placed the population at 80,380.

The metropolitan area delineations published by the Office of Management and Budget in February 2013 no longer include Clay County as a micropolitan statistical area and they no longer treat the two counties as a combined statistical area.

Incorporated places
Artesia
Caledonia
Columbus (principal city)
Crawford
New Hope
West Point (principal city)

Unincorporated places
Bent Oak
Billups
Cedarbluff
Flint Hill
Forreston
Kolola Springs
Mayhew
McCrary
Montpelier
Penns
Pheba
Plum Grove
Steens
Trinity
Wells
Whitebury
Woodlawn

Demographics
As of the census of 2000, there were 83,565 people, 31,001 households, and 22,290 families residing within the CSA. The racial makeup of the CSA was 52.88% White, 45.44% African American, 0.14% Native American, 0.44% Asian, 0.02% Pacific Islander, 0.34% from other races, and 0.74% from two or more races. Hispanic or Latino of any race were 1.05% of the population.

The median income for a household in the CSA was $29,748, and the median income for a family was $36,855. Males had a median income of $30,915 versus $20,057 for females. The per capita income for the CSA was $15,513.

See also
Mississippi census statistical areas
List of metropolitan areas in Mississippi
List of micropolitan areas in Mississippi
List of cities in Mississippi
List of towns and villages in Mississippi
List of census-designated places in Mississippi
List of United States metropolitan areas

References

Geography of Clay County, Mississippi
Geography of Lowndes County, Mississippi
Combined statistical areas of the United States